Victoriya Turks (born 20 October 1987) is a Ukrainian judoka. She competed at the 2016 Summer Olympics in the women's 78 kg event, in which she was eliminated in the second round by Anamari Velenšek.

References

External links
 
 

1987 births
Living people
Ukrainian female judoka
Olympic judoka of Ukraine
Judoka at the 2016 Summer Olympics
Universiade medalists in judo
Universiade gold medalists for Ukraine
European Games competitors for Ukraine
Judoka at the 2015 European Games
21st-century Ukrainian women